The Twelve may refer to:

Arts and entertainment
The Twelve, a fictional organisation in the Killing Eve TV series and Codename Villanelle book series on which it is based 
The Twelve (comics), a Marvel Comics limited series
The Twelve (novel), by Justin Cronin, 2012
"The Twelve" (poem), a Russian poem by Alexander Blok, 1918
Apocalypse: The Twelve, a Marvel Comics crossover storyline
The Twelve, an anthem by William Walton, with text by W.H. Auden
The Twelve (Belgian series), a 2019 Belgian television series
The Twelve (Australian TV series), a 2022 Australian television series

Religion
Anunnaki, or twelve gods of the underworld, in ancient Hittite religion
Quorum of the Twelve, or the Twelve, one of the governing bodies of the Latter Day Saint movement
Twelve Apostles, or the Twelve, the primary disciples of Jesus
The Twelve Imams, the spiritual and political successors to the Islamic prophet Muhammad in the Twelver branch of Shia Islam
Twelve Tribes of Israel, descended from the twelve sons of prophet Jacob
Twelve Minor Prophets, authors of religious works in the Jewish Tanakh and the Christian Old Testament
Twelve Olympians, the major deities of the Greek pantheon

Other uses
"The Twelve", a group of Swedish women including Ellen Key who improved working class ladies' manners
 Twelve astrological signs of the zodiac

See also

12 (disambiguation)
El Libro de los Doce ('The Book about the Twelve'), a book about the Cuban revolution by Carlos Franqui